Daniel Peter Swecker (February 28, 1947 – September 1, 2021) was an American farmer, military officer, and politician.

Biography
He served in the Washington State Senate from the 20th district from 1995 to 2013. He was a Republican.

Swecker died on September 1, 2021, at age 74.

References

1947 births
2021 deaths
Republican Party Washington (state) state senators
Politicians from Bozeman, Montana
Deaths from the COVID-19 pandemic in Washington (state)